Hebia is a genus of flies in the family Tachinidae.

Species
H. cinerea Robineau-Desvoidy, 1863
H. flavipes Robineau-Desvoidy, 1830
H. petiolata

References

Exoristinae
Diptera of Europe
Tachinidae genera
Taxa named by Jean-Baptiste Robineau-Desvoidy